Events in the year 2023 in Rwanda.

Incumbents 
 President: Paul Kagame
 Prime minister: Édouard Ngirente

Events 
 25 January – A DRC Air Force Sukhoi Su-25 is hit by anti-aircraft fire over the Rwandan border. The Rwandan government says its forces took "defensive measures" against a plane that had "violated its airspace".
 September – 2023 Rwandan parliamentary election

Ongoing 
 2022–2023 Democratic Republic of the Congo–Rwanda tensions
 COVID-19 pandemic in Rwanda

References 

 
Rwanda
Rwanda
2020s in Rwanda
Years of the 21st century in Rwanda